= Vita Milk =

Dairy brand from Kosovo

- Type: Milk
- Manufacturer: Devolli Group
- Country of origin: Kosovo
- Region of origin: Peja, Kosovo
- Website: https://www.qumeshtorjavita.com/per-ne/

Vita Milk (Albanian: [tʃumʃ'ti vita]) is a dairy brand from Kosovo. The company produces a variety of milk-based products, including milk, yogurt, cheese, and other dairy products.

Devolli Group, based in Peja, started processing VITA milk on November 19, 2003. VITA milk is the result of several years of fruitful cooperation between Devolli Group and the multinational company Tetra Pak.
